Ian Frederick Taylor (born 15 March 1949) is a former Australian politician and Western Australian Deputy Premier and Opposition Leader.

Taylor was elected to the Western Australian Legislative Assembly in 1981 as the Labor Party (ALP) member for Kalgoorlie. In 1986, he was appointed Minister for Health and also held the Aged Care, Lands and Consumer Affairs portfolios at various times. Following Brian Burke's resignation in 1988, he became Minister for Police in Peter Dowding's ministry, and on Carmen Lawrence's ascension to the premiership in 1990 he became Deputy Premier and Minister for Finance (although his portfolio varied during this time) corresponding to Premier Lawrence also being the Treasurer. Labor was defeated at the 1993 state election and Taylor became Leader of the Opposition in February 1994 when Lawrence resigned to enter federal parliament. He was succeeded by Jim McGinty in October. In 1996 he resigned to contest the federal seat of Kalgoorlie against Labor rebel Graeme Campbell, who defeated him as an independent.  He was only the second WA Labor leader, and the first in over 90 years, not to take the party into an election.

In 2000, Taylor announced his intention to leave the ALP over the treatment of former Labor politician Larry Graham.

See also
1990 Australian Labor Party (Western Australian Branch) leadership spill

References

1949 births
Living people
Members of the Western Australian Legislative Assembly
Australian Labor Party members of the Parliament of Western Australia